Joël Tiéhi (born 12 June 1964) is an Ivorian retired professional footballer who played as a striker.

Career
Tiéhi played in the French Ligue 1 and for the Ivory Coast national team. With his national team, he played at the 1992, 1994, 1996 and 1998 African Cup of Nations, winning the 1992 edition.

Owner
Tiéhi is founder of the Centre de Formation Joël Tiéhi as of 2004.

Personal life
Tiéhi is the father of the Ivorian youth international footballer Christ Tiéhi. Another son Jean-Pierre Tiéhi is also a footballer who plays for Hamilton Academical on loan from Fulham.

References

External links
 
 Profile
 Joël Djohan Tiéhi - Goals in International Matches

1964 births
Living people
Footballers from Abidjan
Association football forwards
Ivorian footballers
Ivory Coast international footballers
Ligue 1 players
Le Havre AC players
RC Lens players
FC Martigues players
Toulouse FC players
Al Jazira Club players
Al Ain FC players
Stade d'Abidjan players
1992 African Cup of Nations players
1994 African Cup of Nations players
1996 African Cup of Nations players
1998 African Cup of Nations players
Africa Cup of Nations-winning players
UAE Pro League players
Ivorian expatriate footballers
Ivorian expatriate sportspeople in France
Expatriate footballers in France